Griotte de Kleparow (— literally "Sweet Cherry of Klepariv") is a dark-red morello, or Griotte, type of cherry which originated from the outskirts of Lviv, modern Ukraine.

Origin and history 

The 'Griotte de Kleparow' was first selected and grown in the historical area of Klepariv, now a suburb of the city of Lviv, Ukraine. It is of unknown parentage, although it is probably a cultivar of sour cherry (Prunus cerasus). One source states that it is a hybrid of sour cherry and wild cherry (Prunus avium).

In 1555 Lviv's city council issued a law ordering its citizens to protect this variety of tree and encouraging its cultivation. This variety became very popular in the 18th and 19th centuries, and its cultivation spread to other parts of Europe, the United States, and Australia.

It was first botanically described in 1792 by Johann Kraft in his Pomona Austriaca. The first known use of the term 'Griotte de Kleparow' was in Great Britain in 1831, and thereafter this was the most commonly used name internationally in botanical and pomological literature.

In Ukraine, the cultivation of 'Griotte de Kleparow' was neglected in the 1930s and it probably has disappeared. Worldwide, the number of cherry cultivars grown has been dramatically reduced, and this variety is no longer commercially grown. It is probably extinct in most countries, though there is some interest in its preservation in France by a heritage fruit society.

General description 

The characteristics of the cultivar have been described in a number of texts:

Tree: strong in growth, large, productive. Branches long, slender, and drooping.

Leaves: Summer leaves have light green color with little red nuances. Big leaves, are oval and extended, have a long and sharp end, and are very dented, supported by short, strong, red leaf stalks. Stipules are of medium length, a bit extended at the base, strongly dented. Leaves during period of fruit production have short ends, shrunken at their base, have intense green color and are supported by medium-length leaf stalks.

Flowers: medium or rather small, elliptic, concave petals, covering partially each other; short, a little bit large, almost sharp, strong red divisions of calyx. Pedicel is short and strong.

Fruit: medium size, generally attached in pairs, roundish-cordate to roundish-oblate, sides often compressed; suture shallow, often a line; stem long, slender, set in a wide, deep cavity. Skin tough, clinging to the flesh, glossy, dark brownish-red, deep black when ripe. Stalk 50 mm long. It ripens at the end of July.

Flesh: tender, fibrous, light to dark colored, juicy, with a rich, sweet and sub-acid flavor, aromatic; quality fair.

Pit: small, turgid, almost spherical.

Propagation: The cultivar can be grown from seed.

Uses 

Griotte is the French word for Morello cherry (a type of sour cherry), and the 'Griotte de Kleparow' is distinguished from other sour cherry varieties like the Montmorency cherry by having darker flesh and juice. The cultivar became popular in Europe for use as a table (dessert) fruit and for making cherry juice.

In Germany in 1824, Lippold and Boumann described it as follows:

In the United States, an 1837 nursery catalog offered grown plants for sale for $0.75 to $1.00 each, and described the trees as "acquiring a medium height, with compact and spherical heads, and able to sustain severe northern climates." It also stated that the cultivar was "most esteemed for quality" and "best for tarts, wine and preserves."

In Great Britain, in 1842 the cultivar was listed as one of 61 cherry varieties "worthy of cultivation" and useful for the table (dessert).

Other names 

'Griotte de Kleparow' has many synonyms in botanical and pomological literature. Some of the synonyms include:

 Череха клепарівська
 Prunus caproniana Schübl. var. kleparoviensis Zaw.
 Belle de Kleparow
 Belle Polonaise
 Bonne Polonaise
 Cerise de Kleparow
 Czerecha kleparowska
 Griotte Kleparite
 Kleparovka
 Kleparovoska
 Kleparower Süssweichsel
 Kleparower Weichsel
 Kleparower
 Kleparowska
 Pohlnische Weichsel
 Polnische grosse Weichsel
 Polnische Kirsche
 Polnische Weichsel
 Ratafia polonica

External links 
 "Quelques cerises du "Montbéliard" et du Doubs (20 variétés)" Article and photo of 'Griotte de Kleparow' (Belle Polonaise) and other rare cherry cultivars.

References 

Cherry cultivars
Flora of Ukraine
Sour cherries